Chalabeh-ye Olya (also Romanized as Chālābeh-ye ‘Olyā; also known as Chālābeh-ye Bālā, Chālāb-e ‘Olyā, and Chalāwa) is a village in Mahidasht Rural District, Mahidasht District, Kermanshah County, Kermanshah Province, Iran. At the 2006 census, its population was 195, in 42 families.

References 

Populated places in Kermanshah County